Aussillon is a commune in the Tarn department and Occitanie region of southern France.

Geography
The Thoré forms the commune's northern border.

Château du Thoré
The Château du Thoré is a large country house built in 1893–4 for Armand Puech, industrialist and inventor of a water filtration system. Surrounded by a very large park, the house is still inhabited today.

Population
Its inhabitants are called Aussillonnais in French.

See also
Communes of the Tarn department

References

Communes of Tarn (department)